A National Anthem is a country's national song.

National Anthem or The National Anthem may also refer to:

Film and television
"The National Anthem" (Black Mirror), an episode of the television series Black Mirror
The National Anthem (film), a 1999 account of the composition of the Chinese national anthem
National Anthem (2003 film), a Japanese horror film
National Anthem (2023 film), an upcoming drama film

Music
National Anthem (album), a 2005 album by The Away Team
"National Anthem" (Lana Del Rey song), 2012
"National Anthem", a 2012 song by The Gaslight Anthem from Handwritten
"The National Anthem" (Benjamin Britten), a 1962 version of "God Save the Queen"
"The National Anthem" (Radiohead song), 2000
"National Anthem", a 2018 song by Todrick Hall from Forbidden

See also
Anthem (disambiguation)
National Flag Anthem (disambiguation), anthems played when hoisting nations' flags
"National Anthem Part 2!", a 2015 song by the USA Freedom Kids
 Nemzeti dal ("National Song"), a 1848 poem written by Sándor Petőfi